This is a list of Canadian films which were released in 1974:

See also
 1974 in Canada
 1974 in Canadian television

References

1974
Canada
1974 in Canada